Francesco De Lucia (21 February 1934 – 15 July 2022) was an Italian politician. A member of the Italian Socialist Party, he was mayor of Bari from 1981 to 1990.

De Lucia died in Bari on 15 July 2022 at the age of 88.

References

1934 births
2022 deaths
20th-century Italian politicians
Italian Socialist Party politicians
Mayors of Bari